Lenny de la Rosa (born November 4, 1983, La Habana, Cuba) is a Cuban actor, singer, model and dancer currently living in Dallas, Texas.

Career 
Lenny de la Rosa began his artistic career as a chorus with singer Gloria Trevi. He studied music at the "National School of Arts in Cuba" and then joined the Center for Arts Education, "CEA" of Televisa, where he became involved in musical theater as Qué plantón, Pachecas a Belén y Princesas en Pugna. Appeared in television in 2010 in telenovela produced by Salvador Mejía Triunfo del amor where he shared credits with William Levy and Maite Perroni.

In 2013, producer Emilio Larrosa given the opportunity to participate in the soap opera entitled Libre para amarte where he played the character of Gerardo "El Gallo" Jiménez and shared credits with Gloria Trevi and Gabriel Soto.

In 2014 participated in the television Bailando por un sueño in Mexico by Charlene Arian, being the eighth eliminated. In the same year he was elected by Giselle González to participate in the telenovela Yo no creo en los hombres in a new adaptation of the soap opera of the same name.

Filmography

Theater

References 

1983 births
Living people
Cuban male stage actors
Cuban male telenovela actors
21st-century Cuban male actors
People from La Habana Province